WDWG (98.5 FM) is a radio station broadcasting a Country format. Licensed to Rocky Mount, North Carolina, United States, it serves the Rocky Mount area. The station is currently owned by First Media Radio, LLC.

WDWG is the only station to air all the games of the Carolina Mudcats minor league baseball team.

History
The former owners of WFMA signed on WSAY "98.5 Down East Country" in 1990. From 1998 through 2004 it was classic country. First Media Radio, LLC changed WSAY to WDWG "The Big Dawg" and tripled the audience.

References

External links
WDWG website

DWG